Jacksonia furcellata, commonly known as grey stinkwood, is a species of leafless broom-like shrub or small tree in the family, Fabaceae, that occurs in the south west of Western Australia. One of the most common plants of the Swan Coastal Plain, it is an excellent colonizer of newly cleared land. It is often seen growing where soil has recently been disturbed, such as alongside new roads.

References 
 
 
 

Mirbelioids
Fabales of Australia
Rosids of Western Australia
Taxa named by Aimé Bonpland
furcellata